Nguyễn Hữu Khôi (born 1 April 1991) is a Vietnamese footballer who plays as a attacker for Khánh Hòa.

Career

Nguyễn started his career with Vietnamese third division side Nam Định. Before the 2017 season, he signed for Đắk Lắk in the Vietnamese second division. Before the 2018 season, Nguyễn signed for South Korean fifth division club Siheung Citizen FC, helping them win the league.

Before the 2019 season, he signed for Khánh Hòa in the Vietnamese top flight, where he suffered relegation and made 12 league appearances and scored 3 goals. On 7 July 2019, Nguyễn debuted for Khánh Hòa during a 1-3 loss to Thanh Hóa. He scored his first goal for Khánh Hòa during a 1-3 loss to Thanh Hóa. In 2021, Nguyễn signed for Vietnamese second division team Khánh Hòa.

References

External links
 

Vietnamese expatriate sportspeople in South Korea
K3 League (2007–2019) players
V.League 1 players
V.League 2 players
Haiphong FC players
Khanh Hoa FC players
Than Quang Ninh FC players
Vietnamese footballers
Association football forwards
Living people
Expatriate footballers in South Korea
Vietnamese expatriate footballers
1991 births